The 2003–04 Memphis Tigers men's basketball team represented the University of Memphis in the 2003–04 college basketball season, the 83rd season of Tiger basketball. The Tigers were coached by fourth-year head coach John Calipari, and they played their home games for the final season at the Pyramid Arena in Memphis, Tennessee.

Roster

Schedule and results

|-
!colspan=9 style=| Regular Season

|-
!colspan=9 style=| Conference USA tournament

|-
!colspan=9 style=| NCAA tournament

Rankings

References

Memphis Tigers men's basketball seasons
Memphis
Memphis
Memphis
Memphis